Love Rules is a 2004 comedy film starring Joey Lawrence and Maggie Lawson, airing on ABC Family. On its premiere night, Love Rules opened up with 4.1 million viewers tuning in for its premiere.

Plot
When Kelly and Michael decide to get married, they want to have an off-beat wedding without all the traditional glitz. But when their friends and Kelly's mother introduce them to the rules of engagement, a simple, intimate wedding becomes a huge production.

Cast
Joey Lawrence as Michael
Maggie Lawson as Kelly
Marilu Henner as Carol
Sergio Di Zio as Kevin
Anna Silk as Lynn
Adam MacDonald as Brian
Elisa Moolecherry as Anne

External links

2004 television films
2004 films
ABC Family original films
American romantic comedy films
2004 romantic comedy films
Films directed by Steven Robman
2000s English-language films
2000s American films